Mukundan Maran (born 23 April 1998) is a Singaporean footballer who is currently playing as a goalkeeper for Balestier Khalsa and the Singapore national team.

Club
In 2017, he signed for Warriors FC. A year later, he was promoted to the first team and made 21 appearances in the 2018 season.

He left the Warriors in 2021 to join Hougang United.

On 10 Jun 2022, Maran started against Johor Darul Ta'zim  in an eventual 8-0 loss and was substituted at half time for Aizil Yazid.

Career statistics

Club

Notes

References

Living people
1996 births
Singaporean footballers
Singaporean people of Tamil descent
Singaporean sportspeople of Indian descent
Association football goalkeepers
Singapore Premier League players